Josu Iriondo (born December 19, 1938) is a Spanish-born American prelate of the Roman Catholic Church who served as an auxiliary bishop of the Archdiocese of New York from 2001 to 2014.

Biography

Early life and education
One of seven children, Josu Iriondo was born on December 19, 1938, in Legazpi, Spain, to Rufino and Maria Leona (née Zabaleta) Iriondo. He was educated in Spanish but spoke Basque at home.

Iriondo decided to pursue the priesthood and then entered the minor seminary of the Canons Regular of the Lateran in Spain at age 12. He later joined the Canons Regular order, and attended Sagrado Corazon Seminary in Oñati, Spain and the Collegio San Vittore in Rome. From 1958 to 1962, Iriondo studied at the Pontifical Gregorian University in Rome

Ordination and ministry
Iriondo was ordained into the priesthood by Bishop Jaime Font y Andreu for the Canons Regular order in San Sebastián, Spain, on December 23, 1962. He then served as professor and master of discipline at a Canons Regular seminary and traveled through Europe on duties related to his religious order. Iriondo also taught at the National Institute, a regional public high school, where served as school secretary as well.

Iriondo came to New York in 1968, accepting an invitation for Spanish priests to serve in the Archdiocese of New York. He then served as chaplain to the Sisters of the Servants of Mary until 1969, when he became parochial vicar at St. Joseph's Parish in Middletown, New York. Iriondo later served as St. Lucy's Parish (1973-1974) and Holy Rosary Parish (1974-1976) in Manhattan.

Iriondo was named parochial vicar (1976) and then pastor (1978) of Our Savior Parish in the Bronx, New York. In 1990, he was appointed director of both the Hispanic Catholic Center and the Charismatic Renewal Movement. Iriondo was incardinated, or transferred, from the Canons Regular Order into the Archdiocese of New York on December 4, 1996, and named vicar for Hispanics in 1997. Iriondo became pastor of St. Anthony of Padua Parish in 2001.

Auxiliary Bishop of New York
On October 30, 2001, Iriondo was appointed as an auxiliary bishop of the Archdiocese of New York and titular bishop of Alton by Pope John Paul II. He received his episcopal consecration on December 12, 2001, from Cardinal Edward Egan, with Bishop Henry Mansell and Robert Brucato serving as co-consecrators. He selected as his episcopal motto: "Dominum et Vivificantem"

Iriondo's letter of resignation as auxiliary bishop of the Archdiocese of New York was accepted by Pope Francis on February 1, 2014.

See also
 

 Catholic Church hierarchy
 Catholic Church in the United States
 Historical list of the Catholic bishops of the United States
 List of Catholic bishops of the United States
 Lists of patriarchs, archbishops, and bishops

References

External links

 Roman Catholic Archdiocese of New York

1938 births
Living people
American people of Basque descent
21st-century American Roman Catholic titular bishops
Spanish emigrants to the United States
Spanish Roman Catholic bishops in North America